Ray Tarantino (born 3 February 1976, Milan, Italy) is a technology entrepreneur, photographer and songwriter of Italian descent.
Reviewers compare Tarantino's lyrical style to Bob Dylan and his musical integrity to Bruce Springsteen.

Early life
Aurelio ‘Ray’ Tarantino was born in the northern Italian city of Milan. He moved to England at the age of 12 to study English at Milton Abbey School in Dorset, where a roommate introduced him to "Tangled Up in Blue" by Bob Dylan.
Tarantino was so moved by what he heard that he bought a guitar and began writing songs.

Career
As an adult, Ray Tarantino survived a near-fatal car crash, which he cites as his reason for abandoning the corporate life for the life of a professional musician.

Tarantino co-produced his debut album, "Recusant" with Tony Bowers, co-founder and former bass player of platinum-selling band, Simply Red. "Recusant" was released by Edel AG and the European label, Ponderosa, which has also released solo-albums by former Police drummer Stewart Copeland. A few months after the album's release, Tarantino was propelled to No. 1 unsigned artist from the UK on MySpace topping the charts alongside Amy Winehouse and Gomez.
As a result, Ivo Grasso signed him to a recording contract with Massive Arts and a publishing deal with Sony/ATV Music Publishing.
He then began solid years of touring across Europe and the US, earning him the media moniker, "Travelling Troubadour."

Working in collaboration, songwriter Giulio Casale wrote the lyrics and Tarantino composed the music for the song, "Senza Pelle," which was recorded by Italian folk singer Patrizia Laquidara.

Delmar Brown, piano player and composer for many musicians, including Sting, Jaco Pastorius and Miles Davis, recorded Tarantino's song, "My Heart Your Heart," on Brown's album, "Inner Spirit."

Tarantino also produced Luca Gemma’s third solo album, “Folkadelic.”

He has performed on American television and on the Italian television show, "Parla Con Me,"
famous for its political satire, liberal views
and critique of Italian Prime Minister Silvio Berlusconi.

In 2010, he opened for Tori Amos at the Villa Arconati Music Festival.
He counts the experience among his career's highlights,
along with meeting legendary musician Taj Mahal.

Tiny Drum Records
released his self-titled second album in 2012 to positive reviews. Tarantino lives in Nashville, where he records for Tiny Drum Records.
Steve Werbelow co-produced Tarantino's third album, "Good Things Will Happen," to be released in 2014. The album includes collaboration with Steve O'Brien, co-writer of the No. 2 Billboard Country Single, "Rock My World (Little Country Girl)," and Jim Reilley, co-founder of The New Dylans.

Discography

Recusant (2007)

Aimlessly – Tour Only Edition (2009)
Ray Tarantino (2012)
Hands Down – Single (2012)
Good Things Will Happen (2014)

References

External links
Tarantino's Website
Tarantino on Youtube
Tarantino on Facebook
Tarantino on Twitter

1976 births
Italian rock singers
Italian singer-songwriters
Living people
Singers from Milan
21st-century Italian singers